Jagath Nandakumar (born 21 May 1969) is a Sri Lankan former first-class cricketer who played for Matara Sports Club. His first match was an unofficial test between Sri Lanka A and Pakistan A at Galle in 2001, and lasted four days long  Later, he became an umpire and stood in matches in the 2007–08 Inter-Provincial Twenty20 tournament.

References

External links
 

1969 births
Living people
Sri Lankan cricketers
Sri Lankan cricket umpires
Matara Sports Club cricketers
Singha Sports Club cricketers
People from Matara, Sri Lanka